This article shows all participating team squads at the 2010 Men's European Water Polo Championship, held in Croatia from 29 August to 11 September 2010.

Source

Source

Source

Source

Source

Source

Source

Source

Source

Source

Source

Source

References

Men
Men's European Water Polo Championship
European Water Polo Championship squads